Evelio Javier Day, officially Governor Evelio B. Javier Day, is a special non-working public holiday in the Philippines to "commemorate the death anniversary of the late Governor Evelio B. Javier" in the four provinces that comprise Panay Island, the Philippines, specifically Antique, Capiz, Aklan, and Iloilo. It has been a holiday on Panay Island every year since 1987. 

Evelio Javier was a politician who was assassinated in the closing days of Ferdinand Marcos's presidency. A staunch supporter of then-presidential candidate Corazon Aquino, he was shot on February 11, 1986, four days after the Snap Elections of 1986 were held but while the counting was continuing. The assassination of Evelio Javier helped lead to Marcos's fall from power during the People Power Revolution, His assassination is seen as a tipping point in Marcos's fall. 

Javier was killed in Freedom Park in San Jose, Antique allegedly under orders from former Assemblyman and Marcos ally Arturo Pacificador but Pacificador was acquitted of charges in 2004. Today Freedom Park is the center of Javier Day celebrations.

References

See also
 Public holidays in the Philippines

 
February observances
Culture of Antique (province)
Culture of Capiz
Culture of Iloilo
Culture of Aklan